Sonerila is a genus of plants in the family Melastomataceae. This genus is characterized the by presence of three petals (along with the genera Stussenia and Lithobium) as opposed to five in the other members of the family. Most members of the genus prefer growing in shady habitats. It is a large genus including about 175 species.

This is primarily an Asiatic genus of the tropical and subtropical regions distributed from India and Sri Lanka to the Indo-Pacific. The members of the group are generally herbs or under shrubs, including some stemless members. Leaves opposite, leaf margin entire or serrulate. Inflorescence usually scorpioid cymes. Flowers in most species purple, some members with reddish or white flowers. Stamens 3, (in one whorl) or rarely 6 (in two whorls). Ovary inferior, 3-celled. Many species of this genus have restricted distribution and very small populations and would thus be regarded as Vulnerable (VU) or Endangered (EN) based on IUCN Red List criteria though this taxon has not yet been assessed for the IUCN Red List.

Species 
Species accepted by the Plants of the World Online as of September 2021:

Sonerila affinis 
Sonerila aiensis 
Sonerila albiflora 
Sonerila amoena 
Sonerila anaimudica 
Sonerila annamica 
Sonerila arguta 
Sonerila arnottiana 
Sonerila arunachalensis 
Sonerila barbata 
Sonerila barnesii 
Sonerila beccariana 
Sonerila belluta 
Sonerila bensonii 
Sonerila bicolor 
Sonerila biflora 
Sonerila bokorense 
Sonerila borneensis 
Sonerila bracteata 
Sonerila brandisiana 
Sonerila brunonis 
Sonerila buruensis 
Sonerila calaminthifolia 
Sonerila calophylla 
Sonerila calycula 
Sonerila cannanorensis 
Sonerila cantonensis 
Sonerila cardamomensis 
Sonerila celebica 
Sonerila clarkei 
Sonerila coimbatorensis 
Sonerila cordifolia 
Sonerila coriacea 
Sonerila corneri 
Sonerila costulata 
Sonerila crassicaulis 
Sonerila crassiuscula 
Sonerila daalenii 
Sonerila decipiens 
Sonerila devicolamensis 
Sonerila dharii 
Sonerila dongnathamensis 
Sonerila elatostemoides 
Sonerila elegans 
Sonerila elliptica 
Sonerila epeduncula 
Sonerila erecta 
Sonerila exacoides 
Sonerila finetii 
Sonerila firma 
Sonerila fraseri 
Sonerila froidevilleana 
Sonerila gadgiliana 
Sonerila gamblei 
Sonerila gardneri 
Sonerila gimlettei 
Sonerila glaberrima 
Sonerila glabricaulis 
Sonerila glabriflora 
Sonerila grandiflora 
Sonerila grandis 
Sonerila griffithii 
Sonerila guneratnei 
Sonerila hainanensis 
Sonerila harmandii 
Sonerila harveyi 
Sonerila helferi 
Sonerila heterophylla 
Sonerila hirsuta 
Sonerila hirsutissima 
Sonerila hirsutula 
Sonerila hirtella 
Sonerila hirtiflora 
Sonerila hookeriana 
Sonerila impatiens 
Sonerila inaequalis 
Sonerila insignis 
Sonerila integrifolia 
Sonerila janakiana 
Sonerila junghuhniana 
Sonerila kanniyakumariana 
Sonerila keralensis 
Sonerila khasiana 
Sonerila kinabaluensis 
Sonerila laeviuscula 
Sonerila lanceolata 
Sonerila lateritica 
Sonerila lecomtei 
Sonerila linearis 
Sonerila longipetiolata 
Sonerila macrantha 
Sonerila maculata 
Sonerila malabarica 
Sonerila margaritacea 
Sonerila metallica 
Sonerila microcarpa 
Sonerila minima 
Sonerila mollis 
Sonerila moluccana 
Sonerila nagyana 
Sonerila nairii 
Sonerila nana 
Sonerila nayariana 
Sonerila neglecta 
Sonerila nemakadensis 
Sonerila neodriessenioides 
Sonerila nervulosa 
Sonerila nidularia 
Sonerila nodosa 
Sonerila nodulosa 
Sonerila nudiscapa 
Sonerila obliqua 
Sonerila obovata 
Sonerila pallida 
Sonerila papuana 
Sonerila parameswaranii 
Sonerila parishii 
Sonerila parviflora 
Sonerila pedunculata 
Sonerila pedunculosa 
Sonerila pilosula 
Sonerila plagiocardia 
Sonerila primuloides 
Sonerila prostrata 
Sonerila pulchella 
Sonerila pulneyensis 
Sonerila pumila 
Sonerila purpurascens 
Sonerila pusilla 
Sonerila raghaviana 
Sonerila ramosa 
Sonerila repens 
Sonerila rheedei 
Sonerila rhombifolia 
Sonerila robusta 
Sonerila rotundifolia 
Sonerila rubro-villosa 
Sonerila rudis 
Sonerila rufidula 
Sonerila ruttenii 
Sonerila ruttneri 
Sonerila sadasivanii 
Sonerila sahyadrica 
Sonerila saxosa 
Sonerila scapigera 
Sonerila secunda 
Sonerila silvatica 
Sonerila speciosa 
Sonerila spectabilis 
Sonerila squarrosa 
Sonerila sreenarayaniana 
Sonerila stricta 
Sonerila succulenta 
Sonerila suffruticosa 
Sonerila sulpheyi 
Sonerila talbotii 
Sonerila tenera 
Sonerila tenuifolia 
Sonerila tetraptera 
Sonerila tinnevelliensis 
Sonerila tomentella 
Sonerila travancorica 
Sonerila trianae 
Sonerila triflora 
Sonerila trinervis 
Sonerila tuberculifera 
Sonerila tuberosa 
Sonerila urceolata 
Sonerila vatphouensis 
Sonerila veldkampiana 
Sonerila velutina 
Sonerila versicolor 
Sonerila verticillata 
Sonerila victoriae 
Sonerila villosa 
Sonerila violifolia 
Sonerila virgata 
Sonerila wallichii 
Sonerila wightiana 
Sonerila woodii 
Sonerila wynaadensis 
Sonerila zeylanica

References

Melastomataceae
Melastomataceae genera